The Gibraltar Medallion of Honour (GMH) is a civil award scheme established by the Government of the British overseas territory of Gibraltar. Its creation was announced in July 2008 by Chief Minister of Gibraltar, Peter Caruana. It ranks below the Freedom of the City of Gibraltar.

Award
The Gibraltar Medallion of Honour is awarded annually by the Gibraltar Parliament on "living or deceased Gibraltarians and others who the Parliament considers have served and contributed to the interests of Gibraltar and its people in an exceptional manner that is particularly worthy of special recognition by the House on behalf of the people of Gibraltar".

Once approved by Parliament, the awards are officially announced by the Mayor of Gibraltar prior to the symbolic release of the red and white balloons on Gibraltar National Day. The Mayor then presents the recipients with the Medallions in a private ceremony held at a later date.

In July 2011, the Gibraltar Parliament passed a motion allowing all Medallion recipients to use the letters GMH after their name as with other HM honours.

Recipients

2008
Upon the award's establishment, the Gibraltar Medallion of Honour was bestowed, posthumously, upon the following persons:
 Albert Risso — for services to trade unionism.
 Jacobo Azagury — for services to the arts.
 Rudecindo Mannia — for services to the arts.
 Sir Howard Davis - for public service
 William Gomez — for services to music.
 Joseph Pitaluga — for public service.
 Dorothy Ellicott — for public service and service to heritage.
 Manolo Mascarenhas — for service to broadcasting.
 John Mackintosh — for philanthropy.
 Peter Isola — for services to politics.
 Aaron Cardozo — for services to Gibraltar.

2009
The 2009 recipients of the Gibraltar Medallion of Honour were:
 Jose Netto — for services to trade unionism and workers.
 Adolfo Canepa, (former Chief Minister) — for public services and services to politics.
 Joseph Gaggero — for services to aviation, shipping, business and commerce.
 Maurice Xiberras — for public services and services to politics.

2010
The 2010 sole recipient of the Gibraltar Medallion of Honour was:
 Bernard Linares — for services to religion, trade unionism, education, public service and politics.

2011
The 2011 sole recipient of the Gibraltar Medallion of Honour was:
 Kaiane Aldorino — for personal achievement in becoming Miss World 2009.

The Roll of Honour
A roll of Medallion recipients is kept: the Roll of Honour. Every year the historical roll is published. Besides the recipients of the Medallion, all recipients of the Freedom of the City are automatically entered into the roll. They are the following:
 Gustavo Bacarisas (painter)
 James Joseph Giraldi (doctor)
 Sir Joshua Abraham Hassan (former Mayor and Chief Minister)
 Sir Robert Peliza (former Chief Minister)
 The Rt Revd Monsignor Patrick Devlin (former Roman Catholic Bishop)
 The Lord Merrivale
 The Lord Bethel
 The Lord Hoyle JP

References

Society of Gibraltar
Awards established in 2008
Awards of British Overseas Territories